World Rugby Men's 15s Dream Team of the Year was first presented in 2021 by World Rugby. They were voted by a panel of international past players and coaches, World Rugby Hall of Fame inductees and the rugby media. The 2021 panel was composed of Maggie Alphonsi (ENG), Fiona Coghlan (IRE), Thierry Dusautoir (FRA), George Gregan (AUS), Richie McCaw (NZL), Brian O’Driscoll (IRE), Melodie Robinson (NZL), John Smit (RSA), and 2003 Coach of the Year, Clive Woodward (ENG).

In 2021, England, France, Ireland, Wales and Scotland each had one player selected; Australia had two, New Zealand with three and South Africa with the majority of five. Four of the Men's 15s Player of the Year nominees were included. The players selected had a combined 850 caps.

Dream Team

References

External links 

 World Rugby Awards

World Rugby Awards